The Basmane-Aliağa Regional was a regional rail service from Basmane Terminal in İzmir to the port town of Aliağa in Turkey. The service started in 1996, when the State Railways completed the branch line from Menemen to Aliağa. Trains stopped at all local stops in northern İzmir. The service was the predecessor of the new Northern Line operated by İZBAN. The service was discontinued in July 2006.

References

Railway services introduced in 1996
Railway services discontinued in 2006